Paul Yeboah (born 4 August 1992), known online by his nicknames  Bello FiGo and Bello FiGo Gu and in the past also as Bello FiGo Gucci and Gucci Boy, is a Ghanaian-Italian YouTuber and singer, known in Italy for his numerous songs in which he often parodies different topics like racism, sexism and politics that often caused controversy and debate in Italy about his social, political and cultural role because of the way he talks about these topics.

Life and career
Born in Accra, Bello FiGo moved to Italy in Parma with his family in 2004. In 2007 he started to publish self-produced music videos on his own YouTube channel. In 22 January 2012 he published the song “Mi faccio una seGha" after which he was started to be called "Capo dello Swag" (English: "Boss of the Swag"); subsequently, after an interview conducted by Andrea Diprè, who claimed, referring to the song, to be "L’opera d’arte, il capolavoro tuo totale" (English: "The work of art, your total masterpiece"), he started to gain the notoriety of the general public of YouTube Italia (albeit his more sudden exposure occurred later). In a first moment he used the nicknames Bello FiGo Gucci and Gucci Boy but the popularity of his videos caused that while people sought "Gucci" in Italian web search engines the first search engine results were about him instead of the Italian brand of fashion Gucci. This caused him to be sued by the company, then withdrawn following a consensual agreement with which Bello FiGo renounced the use of the name Gucci.

Bello FiGo's songs are done in an intentionally poor style called "trash rap" because of the low technical-stylistic quality of his rap music accompanied by bizarre, surreal, satirical and often grammatically incorrect lyrics. His music videos, published only on YouTube, have totaled millions of views (for example, the song "Non Pago Affitto" has as of January 2021 over 30 million views) and have made Bello FiGo a phenomenon of the Internet in Italy.

After the first songs, characterized mainly by topics of vulgarity and sexism, Bello FiGo took over from 2016, with the songs "Sono bello come profugo", "Non Pago Affitto" and "Referendum Costituzionale", a more political role, applying his style and its self-irony to the stereotypical arguments inherent in immigrants in Italy, described as being mostly nasty and delinquent. He also mocked, besides these stereotypes, various political figures. For this reason in 2016 he was defined by Rolling Stone music magazine as "the most politicized artist in Italy", and between the end of 2016 and the beginning of 2017, it suffered several disputes and threats of violence, even of racist background, by groups and subjects close to the extreme right, that led to the cancellation of some of his concerts for fear of public tensions and disorders (in Brescia, in Borgo Virgilio, in Legnano and in Rome). 
On 30 April 2018 he published Swag negro. Non ce la fa nessuno, an autobiographical book.

In December 2019 Bello FiGo was sued by the University of Pisa and its rector, Paolo Mancarella, that declared, after being contacted by the AGI, that the University would have done everything to defend its honour and reputation, because of a song about sex Bello FiGo has published on his official YouTube channel on 6 December 2019, "Trombo a facoltà", that was recorded inside the classes of economics of the University, which declared that its staff didn't know anything about it and didn't give its authorization to record the video.
In February 2020 he released the song "CoronaVirus" that got over 5 million views on YouTube.
On May 11, 2020, he released his third musical album on Spotify and YouTube. The album is called "Terra Transsese in estate".

References 

1992 births
Living people
Ghanaian internet celebrities
Italian YouTubers
Ghanaian emigrants to Italy